Arrivano i gatti is a 1980 Italian comedy film directed by Carlo Vanzina.

Cast
Jerry Calà as Jerry
Franco Oppini as Franco
Nini Salerno as Nini
Umberto Smaila as Umberto
Bruno Lauzi as the supermarket's director
Orchidea De Santis as the adult film actress
Diego Abatantuono as Felice
Ennio Antonelli as Braciola
Danila Trebbi as Danila
Gianni Baghino as Rivetti
Aldo Puglisi as Lieutenant La Pezza
Ugo Bologna as Mario Bonivento
Cesare Gelli as the adult film director
Daniela Basile as Leonarda
Franca Scagnetti as the New Telecineramek's employee
Jimmy il Fenomeno as himself
Hal Yamanouchi as Suzuki
Pietro Zardini as Rimoldi
Barbara Herrera as baroness Romanoff
Cindy Leadbetter as Ingrid

References

External links

1980 films
Films directed by Carlo Vanzina
1980s Italian-language films
1980 comedy films
Italian comedy films
1980s Italian films